Holy Cross College is a coeducational Roman Catholic Sixth Form College, for students aged 16 and above, situated in Bury, Greater Manchester, England. Originally founded by the Daughters of the Cross in 1878, the college also became a University Centre in 1999.

The college has been regarded as one of the top 10 sixth form colleges in the United Kingdom: being placed eighth on the list in 2007 and second in the country in 2008.

History
The college was founded, in 1878, by the Catholic religious order, the Daughters of the Cross of Liège, as a private school and the religious sisters later expanded their foundation to become a larger girls convent grammar school in 1905 (when it became known as the Bury Convent Grammar School).

In 1979, the school became a coeducational sixth form college and adopted its present name, Holy Cross College. It also became a University Centre in 1999. At present, the college has c.2,000 sixth form students and 600 undergraduate students.

Facilities

The college comprises a complex of several buildings.

The Kentigern Building which provides teaching and learning facilities to accommodate a number of different subject areas. This building also contains the new College Chapel.

The Maureen Haverty Building which houses the Art and Design Department.

The College Library which also has an astronomical Observatory.

The college buildings also include a Café for the use of staff and students.

Admissions
Holy Cross College offers education, for pupils aged from 16 to 19, including A Levels and BTEC qualifications as well as a selection of undergraduate degrees.

Academic performance
Holy Cross College entered the top 10 sixth form colleges in the United Kingdom: being placed eighth on the list in 2007, and placed second in the country in 2008. In 2010, it was voted a 5-star best small company to work for.

Students from the college regularly gain places at the Sutton Trust 13 universities (Cambridge, Imperial, Oxford, LSE, UCL, York, Warwick, Bristol, Nottingham, St Andrews, Birmingham, Edinburgh and Durham) and around 85% of students enter into some form of Higher Education. The college also has close educational links with Heidelberg College, in Tiffin, Ohio, United States. The college is also a member of the Maple Group, which is a partnership, created in 2013, of some of country's leading sixth form colleges.

Notable alumni 
Anna Friel - actress (Brookside, Pushing Daisies).

References

External links
 Official website

Sixth form colleges in Greater Manchester
Education in the Metropolitan Borough of Bury
Catholic universities and colleges in England
Learning and Skills Beacons
People educated at Holy Cross College